Dalimil Klapka (22 May 1933 – 14 June 2022) was a Czech actor and dubber.

Life 
He started getting involved with amateur theatre already during his high school studies. In 1953 he was admitted to the Theatre School of the Academy of Performing Arts in Prague (DAMU), from which he graduated in 1957.

For 33 years he was a key actor at the Smíchov Realistic Theatre (today's Švanda Theatre in Smíchov), where he began acting even before completing his studies at DAMU. In addition to theatre and acting, he was also teaching acting at the Prague Conservatory between 1972 and 1993. He also worked at the Karlín Musical Theatre, the Old Town Theatre, the Dlouhá Theatre, the Drama Club and since April 2005 he has worked at the Fidlovačka Theatre. Among other things, he has also worked with Czech Radio and Czech Television.

In addition to acting, Dalimil Klapka was in great demand as a foreign film dubber. For example, he lent his voice to the American actor Peter Falk in the role of Lieutenant Columbo in the well-known television series Columbo or to Grampa Simpson and Principal Skinner, characters from the popular American animated series The Simpsons.

He lived with his wife Stanka Klapková in Smíchov, had two sons and three adult grandchildren.

In the last years of his life, he struggled with cancer. He died on 14 June 2022 in the Motol Hospital.

Theatre roles, selection 
 1984 Grigori Gorin: The Last Death of Jonathan Swift, Judge Bigs, Realistic Theatre, directed by Miroslav Krobot j. h.
 1985 Vasily Shukshin: Lines on the Palm of the Hand, Timofei Khudakov, clerk, Realistic Theatre, directed by Miroslav Krobot

Filmography, selection 
 1980 Okres na severu
 1981 Ta chvíle, ten okamžik
 1984 Sanitka
 1987 Panoptikum města pražského
 1994 Saturnin
 2003 Četnické humoresky (episode 26: Slavnost)
 2008 Goat Story (Kozí příběh – pověsti staré Prahy)
 2012 Goat Story 2 (Kozí příběh se sýrem)

Dubbing roles, selection 
 1970 Columbo – Lieutenant Columbo
 1989 The Simpsons – Abe Simpson, Seymour Skinner
 1992 Star Wars: Episode V – The Empire Strikes Back – Yoda
 2002 Mafia: The City of Lost Heaven – Frank Colletti
 2007 The Simpsons Movie – Abe Simpson, Seymour Skinner
 2009 Futurama – Professor Farnsworth
 2010 Mafia II – Leo Galante
 2020 Mafia: Definitive Edition – Frank Colletti

References

External links 
 
 ČSFD: Profile and list of roles

Czech male film actors
Czech theatre people
Czech male voice actors
Czechoslovak male voice actors
Czech male television actors
Male actors from Prague
1933 births
2022 deaths